Dendryphantes hararensis is a jumping spider in the genus Dendryphantes that lives in South Africa and Zimbabwe.

References

Salticidae
Arthropods of Zimbabwe
Spiders of Africa
Spiders of South Africa
Spiders described in 2008